Yang Chih-yuan (also romanized as Yang Zhi-yuan or Yang Zhiyuan; born 21 January 1990), is a Taiwanese nationalist politician. He comes from a Waishengren family. He is one of the founders of the Taiwanese National Party.

Biography
Yang was born in Taichung.

Yang registered an account on the website of the National Socialism Association in 2006, when he was in middle school.

In 2008, Yang joined the Democratic Progressive Party (DPP) and took part in Wild Strawberries Movement.  He quit the DPP in 2009.

In 2014, Yang and his friend Wu Bai-wei formed the "Tridemist Youth League", during which he met and discussed cooperation with Chang An-lo, president of the Chinese Unification Promotion Party, which  appeal to Chinese unification. This Youth League shares the same name with Kuomintang's historical youth wing (1938–1947).

In 2020, a 25-year-old woman accused Yang of sexual harassment.

On 3 August 2022, Yang was held in custody on suspicion of endangering national security by the National Security Agency of Wenzhou, Zhejiang, China.

References

Living people
1990 births
Taiwanese expatriates in China
Prisoners and detainees of the People's Republic of China
Taiwan independence activists
National Chung Hsing University alumni
People from Taichung